Michael Groß (born 26 July 1956) is a German politician of the Social Democratic Party (SPD) who has been serving as a member of the Bundestag from the state of North Rhine-Westphalia since 2009.

Political career 
Groß became member of the Bundestag in the 2009 German federal election, representing the Recklinghausen II district. He is a member of the Committee on Legal Affairs and Consumer Protection, the Budget Committee and the Audit Committee. On the Budget Committee, he serves as his parliamentary group's rapporteur on the annual budget of the Federal Ministry of Labour and Social Affairs.

References

External links 

  
 Bundestag biography 

1956 births
Living people
Members of the Bundestag for North Rhine-Westphalia
Members of the Bundestag 2017–2021
Members of the Bundestag 2013–2017
Members of the Bundestag 2009–2013
Members of the Bundestag for the Social Democratic Party of Germany